The Coral Museum is a museum in Su'ao Township, Yilan County, Taiwan.

Architecture
The museum is housed in a 3-story building. The ground floor consists of a café and a gift shop, the upper floor displays the culture, ecology and types of corals and the top most floor displays the art of corals.

Transportation
The museum is accessible within walking distance southeast from Su'ao Station of the Taiwan Railways.

See also
 List of museums in Taiwan

References

External links
 

Museums with year of establishment missing
Natural history museums in Taiwan
Museums in Yilan County, Taiwan
Anthozoa